Super Bowl XXI was an American football game between the American Football Conference (AFC) champion Denver Broncos and the National Football Conference (NFC) champion New York Giants to decide the National Football League (NFL) champion for the 1986 season. It was the 21st Super Bowl and was played on January 25, 1987, at the Rose Bowl in Pasadena, California. The Giants defeated the Broncos, 39–20, for their first Super Bowl and first NFL title since 1956.  It was the first of consecutive Super Bowl losses for the Broncos, who lost the Super Bowl a year later 42–10 to the Washington Redskins.

This was the Broncos' first Super Bowl appearance since the 1977 season. Led largely through the play of quarterback John Elway and a defense that led the AFC in fewest yards allowed, the Broncos posted an 11–5 regular season record and two narrow playoff victories. The Giants, led by quarterback Phil Simms, running back Joe Morris, and their "Big Blue Wrecking Crew" defense, advanced to their first Super Bowl after posting a 14–2 regular season record and only allowing a combined total of 3 points in their two postseason wins.

The game was tight in the first half, with the Broncos holding a 10–9 halftime lead, the narrowest margin in Super Bowl history. The only score in the second quarter, however, was Giants defensive end George Martin's sack of Elway in the end zone for a safety. This began the Giants’ run of scoring 26 unanswered points through the third and fourth quarters. Denver would counter with ten additional points toward the end of the game to narrow their margin of victory. The Giants also posted a Super Bowl record 30 points in the second half, and limited the Broncos to only 2 net yards in the third quarter. Simms, who was named the Super Bowl MVP, finished the game with 22 of 25 passes completed for 268 yards and three touchdowns. He also had 25 rushing yards on 3 carries. His 22 out of 25 (88%) completion percentage broke both a Super Bowl and NFL postseason record.

The telecast of the game on CBS was seen by an estimated 87.2 million viewers. The large national audience saw an early appearance of the now-traditional Gatorade shower, where players dump a cooler full of liquid over a coach's head following a meaningful win. The practice was first started by Giants players in 1985; it began to gain national attention during the 1986 season, when Parcells was doused after every win.

Background
NFL owners voted to award Super Bowl XXI to Pasadena, California, on May 24, 1984, during their May 23–25, 1984 meetings in Washington, D.C. Fourteen cities were part of the bidding process, which was scheduled to award four Super Bowls (XXI, XXII, XXIII, and XXIV). The bidding cities included: Anaheim, Detroit, Houston, Jacksonville, Miami, Minneapolis, New Orleans, Pasadena, Philadelphia, San Francisco, San Diego, Seattle, Tampa, and Tempe. The Philadelphia host committee assembled what was considered a strong, but long-shot bid, hoping to win the first outdoor Super Bowl in a cold weather city. Minneapolis went above and beyond in selling their unsuccessful bid, even running a staging a parade in the lobby of the hotel hosting the NFL owners' meeting that included a woman on a white horse. To counter, Philadelphia Eagles-owner Leonard Tose launched a parade in the style of the Mummers Parade, featuring with musicians and clowns. Philadelphia ultimately came close to landing a Super Bowl at Veterans Stadium, nearly approaching the needed number of votes to secure the game. The city's momentum was disrupted after the NFL owners passed a resolution calling for a future Super Bowl to be held in a Northern city with a domed stadium, affirming the league's interest in another cold weather city hosting the game, while undermining Philadelphia's ongoing effort to have the dome-less Veterans Stadium host a Super bowl.

The balloting for XXI took 13 ballots and over two hours to complete, with Pasadena finally receiving the winning bid. XXII was also voted on, but the voting for XXIII and XXIV was postponed. This was the fourth time that Pasadena hosted the game, and the sixth time it was held in the Greater Los Angeles Area.

Denver Broncos

The Broncos won the AFC West with an 11–5 regular season record, largely through the play of quarterback John Elway. In just his fourth season in the league, Elway made an impact to the team with his ad-libbing skills. During the regular season, he had thrown for 3,480 yards and 19 touchdowns, while also rushing for 257 yards, the third-leading rusher on the team.

Elway did not really have a particular receiver who caught most of his passes during the regular season, but wide receivers Mark Jackson, Vance Johnson, Steve Watson, and tight end Orson Mobley all combined for 136 receptions and 2,132 yards. Pro Bowl running back Sammy Winder was the Broncos' top rusher with 789 yards and 9 touchdowns, while also catching 26 passes for another 171 yards and 5 touchdowns. Halfback Gerald Willhite rushed for 365 yards and 5 touchdowns, while also leading the team in receptions with 64 (for 529 yards and three touchdowns), and ranking third in the NFL in both punt return yards (468) and yards per return average (11.1). The Broncos also had a powerful offensive line, led by Pro Bowl guard Keith Bishop.

The Broncos' defense led the AFC in fewest rushing yards allowed (1,651). The defensive line was anchored by Pro Bowl defensive end Rulon Jones, who recorded 13.5 sacks and a fumble recovery. Denver's linebacking corps, led by three-time Pro Bowler Tom Jackson and Karl Mecklenburg, who recorded 9.5 sacks, was viewed as comparable to the Giants' Pro Bowl linebackers. Their secondary was led by Pro Bowl cornerbacks Dennis Smith and Louis Wright, along with Mike Harden, who intercepted 6 passes and returned them for 179 yards and 2 touchdowns. Wright, Steve Foley, and Jackson, the last remnants of Denver's Orange Crush defense of the 1970s, all retired after this Super Bowl.

New York Giants

The Giants advanced to their first Super Bowl in team history, and were playing for their first league championship since they lost to the Chicago Bears in the 1963 NFL Championship Game. The Giants were led by quarterback Phil Simms, who threw for 3,487 yards and 21 touchdowns (but also 22 interceptions). Simms' main target was tight end Mark Bavaro, who caught 66 passes for 1,001 yards and 4 touchdowns. Although the Giants did not have one great wide receiver, they did have several good ones. Receivers Stacy Robinson, Bobby Johnson, and Phil McConkey combined for 76 receptions and 1,307 yards.

However, running the ball was the Giants' primary offensive attack. Running back Joe Morris finished the regular season with a then-franchise record 1,516 rushing yards and 14 touchdowns, while also catching 21 passes for 223 yards and another touchdown. One reason for his success was fullback Maurice Carthon, who provided Morris with excellent blocking and was the team's second leading rusher with 260 yards. Another reason was the play of their offensive line, led by Pro Bowl left tackle Brad Benson and right tackle Karl Nelson. On special teams, punter Sean Landeta made the Pro Bowl with an average of 44.8 gross yards per punt (2nd in the NFL), a net average of 37.1, and 24 punts inside the 20.

But the Giants main strength was their defense, nicknamed The "Big Blue Wrecking Crew". After giving up 31 points in a season-opening loss to the Dallas Cowboys, the Giants had not given up more than 20 points in a game until the last game of the season, in a 55–24 win over the Green Bay Packers.  The team ranked second in the NFL in fewest points (236) and yards (4,757) allowed. The Giants' defensive leader was Hall of Fame outside linebacker Lawrence Taylor, who led the league with 20.5 sacks during the regular season, won the NFL Defensive Player of the Year Award for the third time in his career, and became just the second defensive player to win the NFL Most Valuable Player Award (Alan Page was the first in 1971). At 6'3" and 245 pounds, Taylor was big enough to break through the offensive lines of many teams, but he still had enough speed to chase down running backs. The Giants' other starting linebackers, Gary Reasons, Carl Banks, and future Hall of Famer Harry Carson, did not get as much media attention as Taylor, but Carson had been selected to play in the Pro Bowl, while Reasons had two interceptions and Banks recorded 6.5 sacks and 2 fumble recoveries. Nose tackle Jim Burt and right end Leonard Marshall, who were also both selected to the Pro Bowl, anchored the defensive line. Marshall recorded 12 sacks, 3 fumble recoveries, and 1 interception during the season.  The Giants secondary was led by safeties Terry Kinard (4 interceptions, 2 fumble recoveries) and Kenny Hill (3 interceptions, 3 fumble recoveries), along with cornerback Perry Williams (4 interceptions).

With the play of their defense, the running attack led by Morris, and Simms' passing game, the Giants earned a 14–2 regular season record.

This is the only one of the New York Giants’ five Super Bowl appearances where they were favored.

Playoffs

Elway's ability to improvise on the fly, in part, helped Denver to make it through the playoffs, narrowly defeating the New England Patriots 22–17, and the Cleveland Browns 23–20, in the AFC Championship Game. The AFC Championship Game against the Browns was particularly significant because Elway displayed why many NFL experts thought Super Bowl XXI would be the first of many Super Bowls for him. In what became known as The Drive, the Broncos started from their own 2-yard line, trailing 20–13, with 5:32 left to play. But in 15 plays, Elway led Denver 98 yards for a game-tying touchdown pass with 39 seconds left. The Broncos then won in overtime after Elway led them 60 yards in 9 plays to set up kicker Rich Karlis' game-winning field goal.

Meanwhile, the Giants went on to only allow a combined total of 3 points in their playoff victories over the San Francisco 49ers, 49–3, and the Washington Redskins, 17–0, respectively. The dominating performances by the Giants' defense gave the team extra confidence going into their Super Bowl matchup versus the Broncos.

Super Bowl pregame news
Much of the pregame hype centered around the confrontation between Elway and Taylor, and whether or not Taylor would be able to hurry Elway's throws or sack him. The Giants had narrowly defeated Denver during the regular season, forcing four turnovers in a 19–16 win despite being outgained in total yards 405 to 262.  This was the last Super Bowl until Super Bowl XXXIV in which both teams entered the game having never won a Super Bowl before.

As the designated home team in the annual rotation between AFC and NFC teams, the Giants wore their home blue uniforms and white pants. The Broncos donned their all-white road uniforms.

The New York players in this game wore stickers with the number 38 on their helmets as a tribute to former Giants fullback John Tuggle, who had died of cancer shortly before the start of the season at age 25.  They also had patches on their uniforms as a memorial to former Giants defensive back Carl Lockhart, who had died of lymphoma at the age of 41 one month before Tuggle.

Broadcasting

The game was broadcast in the United States by CBS and featured the broadcast team of play-by-play announcer Pat Summerall and color commentator John Madden. Brent Musburger of The NFL Today anchored The Super Bowl Today pregame, halftime and postgame coverage. Helping Musburger were reporters Irv Cross and Will McDonough and analysts Jimmy "The Greek" Snyder, Terry Bradshaw, Joe Theismann, CBS News reporter Charles Osgood and Dan Dierdorf (in his final CBS assignment before moving on to ABC's Monday Night Football for the following season; Dierdorf would return to CBS for the 1999 season). The game was also the first NFL game to be broadcast in Dolby Surround sound and in stereo. The game was also broadcast in Canada on CTV and in the United Kingdom on Channel 4. The latter had commentary by Frank Gifford, John Smith and Don Shula. This was also the first Super Bowl to be telecast on commercial television in Asia, as the GMA Network in the Philippines aired its first Super Bowl. This game also marked the first Super Bowl to be broadcast live in Rome.

In the teams' local markets, the game was also broadcast by CBS stations in the New York City and Denver markets, WCBS-TV 2 in New York City and KMGH-TV 7 in Denver.

The postgame show was supposed to feature the song "One Shining Moment" but due to postgame interviews taking so long, CBS never aired it. They ultimately changed the lyrics from "The ball is kicked" to "The ball is tipped" in time for the 1987 Final Four (in which Indiana University won its most recent national title to date), and the song has since then been played at the end of the network's annual NCAA Men's Division I Basketball Championship coverage (it is also played on Turner Sports when said game airs on that network due to alternating rights with CBS that first started in 2016). CBS also debuted the theme music (composed by Lloyd Landesman) that would later be used for their college football coverage during this game (still used as of the 2020 season), as well as its open that was used through 1990.

This Super Bowl is featured in NFL's Greatest Games under the title Land of the Giants and was narrated by John Doremus.

Nationally on radio, the game was carried over the NBC Radio Network. Don Criqui served as play-by-play with Bob Trumpy his color commentator. This was the last Super Bowl called by Criqui, as NBC Radio lost NFL rights following the season and he returned to his secondary play-by-play role on NBC television. Trumpy would call two more Super Bowls for NBC television (Super Bowl XXVII and Super Bowl XXVIII) as part of the network's No. 1 broadcast team. In the teams' local markets, the game was carried on WNEW-AM in New York City with Jim Gordon and Dick Lynch and KOA-AM in Denver, Colorado, with Bob Martin and Larry Zimmer.

Entertainment
The pregame show was a salute to California and featured the pop music group The Beach Boys and Canadian jazz fusion band The Shuffle Demons. Singer Neil Diamond performed the national anthem. The show was directed and choreographed by Lesslee Fitzmorris.  The coin toss ceremony featured Pro Football Hall of Fame defensive lineman Willie Davis.

The halftime show was a "Salute to Hollywood's 100th Anniversary" featuring an introduction by George Burns (who was only nine years younger than the Hollywood neighborhood in Los Angeles) and a performance by the Southern California high school drill teams and dancers.

As had been their tradition all season, upon securing their victory, Giants players celebrated by dumping a Gatorade cooler on head coach Bill Parcells. The 1986 Giants were the first team to initiate what has now become a standard post-game celebration, and the Super Bowl telecast enabled a large, national audience to first witness what has become commonplace.

Super Bowl XXI MVP Phil Simms became the first athlete to appear in an "I'm going to Disney World!" television ad, being recorded shouting the phrase while celebrating the team's victory immediately after the game.

Game summary

First quarter
On the Broncos' first play after receiving the opening kickoff, quarterback John Elway faked a handoff, then spun around and ran in the opposite direction for a 10-yard gain to the Denver 34-yard line. Then on third down, his 24-yard completion to receiver Mark Jackson advanced the ball to the Giants' 39-yard line. However, the Giants' defense tightened up and halted the drive at the 30-yard line, forcing Denver to settle for Rich Karlis's 48-yard field goal to give them a 3–0 lead. Karlis's kick tied a game record for longest field goal set by Jan Stenerud of the Kansas City Chiefs in Super Bowl IV.

The Giants then took the ensuing kickoff and stormed right back on a 9-play, 78-yard drive. First, quarterback Phil Simms completed a 17-yard pass to receiver Lionel Manuel. Then running back Joe Morris ran for 11 yards to the Denver 41-yard line. The Giants then marched to the Denver 6-yard line with Simms' 18-yard pass to receiver Stacy Robinson, and then a 17-yard completion to tight end Mark Bavaro two plays later. Finally, Simms threw a 6-yard touchdown pass to tight end Zeke Mowatt, giving the Giants a 7–3 lead.

Denver kick returner Ken Bell gave his team great field position by returning the ensuing kickoff 28 yards to the Broncos 42-yard line. Elway's first two plays were a 14-yard completion to running back Sammy Winder, an 11-yard completion to tight end Orson Mobley, moving the ball to the New York 33-yard line. On the next play Elway called a screen pass for Winder, which he ran for a gain of nine yards before going out of bounds. Linebacker Harry Carson hit Winder after he stepped out, garnering a flag for a personal foul. Then, a second penalty was assessed to Lawrence Taylor, who was called for unsportsmanlike conduct for picking up and throwing the first flag.

Carson's penalty was assessed for twelve yards, half the distance to the goal from the spot of the dead ball, and Taylor's was for half the distance from that spot, resulting in a first down at the Giants' 6-yard line. On third down, Elway scored on a quarterback draw to regain the lead for the Broncos. Karlis added the extra point for a 10–7 score.

Second quarter
On Denver's first drive of the second quarter, Elway dropped back to pass from his own 18-yard line on third down. The Giants' pass rush forced him to scramble out of the pocket, but it gave him time to find receiver Vance Johnson, who was wide open, for a 54-yard completion. Elway then moved the Broncos down the field further and after a third down completion to Steve Sewell, the third time Denver converted on the drive (Elway found Mobley for a second first down after the Johnson play), they had the ball on the New York 1 with a chance to go up by 10.

Needing a stop, the Giants stood their ground. First, Elway tried a run-pass option, but Taylor broke through the line and tackled him for a one-yard loss. Carson stopped fullback Gerald Willhite on the next play for no gain on a run up the middle, and Carl Banks chased down Winder as he attempted to score on a sweep, tackling him for a four-yard loss. After losing five yards in three plays, Karlis tried to salvage the drive with a field goal, but he missed from 23 yards, giving him the record for the shortest missed field goal in Super Bowl history.

The Giants picked up a first down on the first play of the ensuing drive as Mark Bavaro caught a pass from Simms for twelve yards on the first play from scrimmage. Simms followed that up with an eight-yard completion to Stacy Robinson, and two plays later Morris picked up a first down with a short run. The drive stalled there, and the Broncos got the ball back on their 15. Elway was sacked on the first play of the ensuing drive, setting up a second down. What followed was one of the more crucial calls of the game.

With the ball on the Denver 13, Elway found Clarence Kay for a gain of 25 yards and an apparent first down. However, referee Jerry Markbreit conferred with his crew and reversed the call, determining that Kay had not controlled the football before being tackled. However, the discussion among the crew continued for some time before NFL Director of Officiating Art McNally paged umpire Bob Boylston; this meant that, for the first time, the newly introduced instant replay system would be used in a Super Bowl.

The crew then waited while McNally and the officials in the replay booth took a second look at the play. They ruled that the play would stand as called, as an incomplete pass. Indeed, there were no conclusive replays that the officials could find that indicated Kay caught the pass. CBS, however, was able to find one that the officials had not seen; the production crew found a reverse angle shot of the play that proved conclusively that Kay caught the pass cleanly. The network broadcast this replay toward the end of the first half.

The Giants managed to capitalize on the next play as Elway, under pressure, retreated into the end zone and was tackled there by veteran defensive lineman George Martin, giving up a safety and cutting the Broncos’ lead to 10–9. The defense, however, was able to hold the Giants to a three-and-out on the drive following the ensuing free kick. 
 
With 1:09 left in the half, Elway started from his own 37-yard line. On second down, he completed a 31-yard pass to receiver Steve Watson and then an 11-yard pass to Willhite, giving the Broncos a first down at the Giants 21. They moved the ball to the New York 16-yard line, which resulted from a penalty on Jim Burt for jumping offsides, but the Giants forced two incompletions. The last of these saw Elway lead tight end Orson Mobley too far on a throw to the end zone and cause him to collide with the goal post.

Despite having missed a relative chip shot field goal on his last attempt, Karlis was called upon again to try to extend the Denver lead. Despite having made all but one of his attempts inside of forty yards during the regular season, Karlis once again pulled the kick to the right and the drive ended with no points. Karlis later admitted his two misses in the first half were devastating to the Broncos. "Both times I didn't get my hips all the way through the kicks. I was steering the ball, and I know better than that. I felt the team unravel after that. I really hurt them."

Third quarter
In the second half, the Giants dominated the Broncos, outscoring them 30–10 with four touchdowns and a field goal on their first five possessions.

The Giants took the opening kickoff in the third quarter, but faced fourth down and one yard after their first three plays. New York sent their punt formation out onto the field. Parcells had entertained the possibility of running a fake punt and sent Jeff Rutledge, his backup quarterback, onto the field to line up as a third blocking back along with Maurice Carthon and Lee Rouson. Parcells said his reasoning was that if the Broncos were not going to pick up on Rutledge being used as a decoy for a potential fake, he would take advantage. As he had thought, Denver paid no attention to Rutledge, and he moved under center while punter Sean Landeta split out as a receiver and Carthon and Rouson lined up in a split back set behind him. Rutledge then took the snap from center and ran a quarterback sneak to the New York 48-yard line for a first down. On the next play, Simms completed a 12-yard pass to Morris, and then followed it up with a 23-yard completion to Rouson. Three plays later, Simms finished the drive with a 13-yard touchdown pass to Bavaro to give the Giants a 16–10 lead. The Broncos were forced to punt on their next drive, and receiver Phil McConkey returned the punt 25 yards to Denver's 36-yard line. The Broncos managed to keep the Giants out of the end zone, but New York kicker Raúl Allegre kicked a 21-yard field goal to increase their lead to 19–10.

Denver was again forced to punt on their ensuing possession. Afterwards, Simms completed a 17-yard pass to Manuel at the Broncos 45-yard line. Two plays later, the Giants executed a flea flicker play for a long gain. Simms handed off to Morris, but before he crossed the line of scrimmage, Morris pitched the ball back to Simms. With the ensuing pass, Simms found McConkey, who was wide open at the Broncos 20-yard line. After eluding one tackler, he was upended just before he reached the goal line, throwing his hands up in mock frustration after being stopped at the 1-yard line. On the next play, Morris scored on a 1-yard touchdown run, increasing New York's lead to 26–10 and essentially putting the game away.

Fourth quarter
Elway barely avoided a turnover by recovering his own fumble on the last play of the third quarter, but on the first play of the fourth quarter, he threw an interception to Giants defensive back Elvis Patterson. After that, Simms completed a 36-yard pass to Robinson. Four plays later from Denver's 6-yard line, Simms threw a pass to Bavaro in the end zone. The pass bounced off Bavaro's fingertips, but fell right into the hands of McConkey for a touchdown, extending the lead to 33–10.

The Broncos, now playing for pride, finally managed to get a good drive going on their next possession, advancing the ball 74 yards in 13 plays. Elway completed 5 of 6 passes for 46 yards and rushed for 14, while Karlis finished the drive with a 33-yard field goal, making the score 33–13. But New York recovered his ensuing onside kick attempt and stormed right back for more points. Rouson ran twice for 21 yards, and then Simms ran for a 22-yard gain. On the next play, Ottis Anderson scored on a 2-yard touchdown run, giving the Giants a 39–13 lead after Allegre missed the extra point.

Denver finally scored a touchdown when Elway found Johnson on a 47-yard bomb later on, which was the 100th recorded Super Bowl touchdown. However, by that point, the game had become so far out of reach that it did not do much good. Elway would eventually be replaced by Gary Kubiak, who took a sack to end the game, and the Giants were victorious in a 39–20 rout of the Broncos.

As the final seconds of the game ticked away, Harry Carson, continuing the recent trend started by the Giants, gave head coach Bill Parcells a Gatorade shower, going as far as to take off his jersey and pads and sneak behind Parcells with a Rose Bowl security team shirt on. Thanks in large part to this particular Gatorade dunking, a tradition of sorts was formed that continues to this day. In addition, Brad Benson and Bart Oates drenched Simms with a cooler of ice water; "I think it was very appropriate to cool the guy down", Oates explained, "as hot as he was in the game."

Simms finished with a passer rating of 150.92, the highest for one game in Super Bowl history. Morris was the top rusher of the game, gaining 67 yards, and added another 20 yards on 4 receptions. Robinson was the Giants' top receiver with 3 catches for 62 yards. Bavaro caught 4 passes for 51 yards and a touchdown. McConkey caught 2 passes for 50 yards and a touchdown, returned a punt for 25 yards, and even got to make a contribution after the game, discovering a dropped police pistol on the field and turning it over to a stadium security guard. Defensively, while the Broncos managed to bottle up Lawrence Taylor, Carl Banks had 14 tackles, 10 of which were unassisted and four of those for negative yardage, while Leonard Marshall had two sacks and forced a fumble. Elway finished the game with 22 out of 37 pass completions for 304 yards, 1 touchdown, and 1 interception. He also was the Broncos' leading rusher in the game, with 27 rushing yards and a touchdown on 6 carries. Denver's Vance Johnson was the top receiver of the game, with 5 receptions for 121 yards, an average of 24.2 yards per catch, and a touchdown.

The Giants' victory in Super Bowl XXI marked the second time in four months that the New York metropolitan area had won a championship in a major professional sport; three months before, the New York Mets had won the 1986 World Series.

Box score

Final statistics
Sources: NFL.com Super Bowl XXI, Super Bowl XXI Play Finder NYG, Super Bowl XXI Play Finder Den

Statistical comparison

Individual statistics

1Completions/attempts
2Carries
3Long gain
4Receptions
5Times targeted

Records set
The following records were set in Super Bowl XXI, according to the official NFL.com boxscore, the 2016 NFL Record & Fact Book and the Pro-Football-Reference.com game summary. Some records have to meet NFL minimum number of attempts to be recognized. The minimums are shown (in parenthesis).

Turnovers are defined as the number of times losing the ball on interceptions and fumbles.

This is also the first, and only time in history, an NFL game ended with a final score of 39–20.

Starting lineups
Source:

Officials
 Referee: Jerry Markbreit #9-second Super Bowl (XVII)
 Umpire: Bob Boylston #101 first Super Bowl
 Head Linesman: Terry Gierke No. 72 first Super Bowl
 Line Judge: Bob Beeks #59 fourth Super Bowl (XIV, XVI, XVIII)
 Back Judge: Jim Poole No. 92 first Super Bowl
 Side Judge: Gil Mace #90 second Super Bowl (XVIII)
 Field Judge: Pat Mallette #82 first Super Bowl
 Alternate Umpire: Hendi Ancich #115 worked Super Bowl XXIV

References

Bibliography
 Super Bowl official website
 
 
 
 https://www.pro-football-reference.com/boxscores/198701250den.htm Super Bowl XXI box score and Large online database of NFL data and statistics
 Super Bowl play-by-plays from USA Today (Last accessed September 28, 2005)

Super Bowl
New York Giants postseason
Denver Broncos postseason
American football competitions in California
Sports competitions in Pasadena, California
1986 National Football League season
1987 in American football
1987 in sports in California
20th century in Pasadena, California
January 1987 sports events in the United States